The Oakland Clippers (active 1967–1968, also named the California Clippers) were an American soccer team based in Oakland, California. They played in the non-FIFA sanctioned National Professional Soccer League (NPSL) in 1967 and the North American Soccer League (NASL) in the following season. Their home field was Oakland–Alameda County Coliseum.

Overview
The Clippers brought the first-ever national professional championship in any sport to the San Francisco Bay Area and the City of Oakland. Team owners originally planned to play in San Francisco until General Manager Derek Liecty convinced them that the new Oakland-Alameda County Coliseum was a better choice than San Francisco's old and windy Kezar stadium. Through connections in Yugoslavia, the Clippers were able to hire Dr. Aleksandar Obradovic, former Team Manager of Red Star of Belgrade. Obradovic brought with him Red Star coach and former Yugoslav international Ivan Toplak as well as a nucleus of six first-division players who were willing to play in the non-sanctioned league. During the 1967/1968 season the Clippers had players from ten countries.
In 1967 they won the NPSL Western Division and overall regular season titles. They went on to win the NPSL Final over the Baltimore Bays by a two-game, home-and-home aggregate score of 4-2. They also won the Commissioner's Cup over the St. Louis Stars by a score of 6-3. Following the 1967 season, the team joined the newly formed North American Soccer League (NASL), the result of the merger between the NPSL and the United Soccer Association (USA). 

In 1968, the Clippers had an identical record to the Western Division Champion San Diego Toros and a higher goal-differential, but the Toros had more league points. As the result of a disputed referee’s off-side call in their final regular season game against the San Diego Toros, a 3-3 tie, the Clippers finished in second place and were eliminated from the playoffs. The unique points system denied them the chance to defend their 1967 NPSL title in 1968’s merged league.  
The North American Soccer League was near collapse in September 1968. Having no possible League opponents west of Dallas, Texas and wanting to maintain the team while waiting for the NASL to become reconstituted, the Clippers began playing an independent schedule as the California Clippers against top foreign club teams. These efforts included bringing to the United States for the first time a team from the Soviet Union, league club champion Dynamo Kiev. The three-game match up was split with a win and a tie for each.
Alarmed by the success of the Clippers and concerned that such an independent schedule might thwart plans for a reconstituted NASL, the United States Soccer-Football Association placed restrictions on the Clippers and prevented them from arranging any further international games. Just before the ban, the Clippers defeated Italian league champion Fiorentina in their final game by a score of  4-2 and posted an exhibition match record of 7-6-2. The Clippers ceased operations on June 4, 1969. The team's owners had lost $1.5 million while running the team and cited the dysfunctional relationship between various governing bodies as a reason for folding the team.

Several Clippers players, as well as coach Ivan Toplak, went on to join the original San Jose Earthquakes team founded as a member of the North American Soccer League in 1974: Goalkeeper Mirko Stojanovic, leading scorer Ilija Mitić, Momčilo "Gabbo" Gavrić, and Milan Čop.

Year-by-year

Honors

National Professional Soccer League
Champions: 1967
Premiers: 1967
Commissioner's Cup: 1967
Western Division: 1967

1967 First Team All-Stars
Mirko Stojanovic
Mel Scott
Ilija Mitic
Mario Baesso

North American Soccer League
1968 First Team All-Stars
Mirko Stojanović 
Mel Scott
Momcilio Gavric
David Davidovic
Ilija Mitic

1968 Second Team All-Stars
Milan Čop
Mario Baesso

Team Roster

1967 Roster

References 

 
Defunct soccer clubs in California
Sports teams in Oakland, California
National Professional Soccer League (1967) franchises
North American Soccer League (1968–1984) teams
1967 establishments in California
1969 disestablishments in California
Soccer clubs in California
Association football clubs established in 1966
Association football clubs disestablished in 1969